Edith Picht-Axenfeld (Freiburg im Breisgau, 1 January 1914 – Hinterzarten, 19 April 2001) was a German pianist and harpsichordist.

Career
She started her concert career in 1935, and took part two years later in the III International Chopin Piano Competition, when she was awarded the sixth prize; this launched her career. After the Second World War, Picht-Axenfeld performed at an intercontinental level, was active as a chamber musician and recorded for labels such as Deutsche Grammophon, Philips and Erato. RCA released an LP with Chopin's Études op. 10 and op. 25 with Picht-Axenfeld.

Picht-Axenfeld married the professor for philosophy Georg Picht in 1936. They had seven children, among them Robert Picht.

Influence as a teacher
She taught at the Staatliche Hochschule für Musik in Freiburg im Breisgau from 1947 to 1979. Many pianists, and also composers like Manfred Stahnke, explicitly mention her as an important influence.

Recordings
Her 1968 recording of the Goldberg Variations is often considered as a point of reference and there obviously is still a fan base that has uploaded many full albums to YouTube.

References

External links
 
 

German classical pianists
1914 births
2001 deaths
Prize-winners of the International Chopin Piano Competition
Academic staff of the Hochschule für Musik Freiburg
20th-century classical pianists
20th-century German musicians
German women pianists
Women classical pianists
20th-century women pianists